Novy Istochnik is a rural locality (a settlement) in Sosnovskoye Rural Settlement, Vologodsky District, Vologda Oblast, Russia. The population was 35 as of 2002. There are 3 streets.

Geography 
Novy Istochnik is located 24 km west of Vologda (the district's administrative centre) by road. Striznevo is the nearest rural locality.

References 

Rural localities in Vologodsky District